The Binson Echorec is an echo machine produced by Italian (Milan) company Binson founded by  Dr. Bonfiglio Bini, an early manufacturer of such devices. Unlike most other analog echo machines, they used an analog magnetic drum recorder instead of a tape loop.

After using Meazzi Echomatic machines successfully to establish his signature sound, Hank Marvin of The Shadows began using Binson echoes. He used various Binson units on record and stage for much of the mid-to-late 1960s, in conjunction with Vox AC30 amplifiers and Burns London guitars. Marvin continued to use Binsons until c.1979/1980, when he began using the Roland RE-201 echo.

Binson units were used to great effect by Pink Floyd's original frontman Syd Barrett and then guitarist David Gilmour, but also by keyboardist Richard Wright. The classic Binson delay effect can be heard on songs such as "Interstellar Overdrive", "Astronomy Domine", "Shine On You Crazy Diamond" and "Time". 

In Pink Floyd's 23-minute-long song "Echoes", Roger Waters used a Binson Echorec to create the eerie underwater wind noise heard during the first interlude (10:40-15:02 on studio recordings, underneath the screaming seabird cries produced by Gilmour); he vibrated the strings of his bass guitar with a steel slide and fed the sound through the Echorec. Waters reproduced this sound during live performances. "One of These Days", a song written in the same period as "Echoes", features the effect prominently on the bass part that plays throughout the song. The Binson Echorec was a major part of the early Pink Floyd sound, until they started to use the VCS3 synthesizer in 1972. Pink Floyd's Binson Echorec Baby was displayed at the Victoria and Albert Museum as part of the 2017 Their Mortal Remains exhibition.

See also 
 Roland Space Echo
 Echoplex

References

Bibliography

External links 
 https://web.archive.org/web/20120317084352/http://binsonamoremio.altervista.org/
 http://binson-museum.weebly.com/
 http://www.radiomuseum.org/r/binson_echorec_2_t7e.html
Sound recording technology
Effects units
Pink Floyd